Dipterocarpus glabrigemmatus is a species of tree in the family Dipterocarpaceae. The tree is endemic to Borneo (Kalimantan and Sarawak).

Range and habitat
Dipterocarpus glabrigemmatus is known from five locations in Sarawak state of Malaysia, and a single unspecified location in Kalimantan (Indonesian Borneo), where it grows in lowland rainforest. It has an extent of occurrence of 6,327 km2 and area of occupancy of 52 km2.

The species is threatened with habitat loss from timber harvesting, fires, and conversion of forest to agriculture. Its conservation status is assessed as endangered.

References

glabrigemmatus
Endemic flora of Borneo
Trees of Borneo
Critically endangered flora of Asia
Flora of the Borneo lowland rain forests
Plants described in 1978